Marie Gayot (born 18 December 1989 in Reims) is a retired French sprint athlete. She specialized in 400m and set her personal best of 50.97s in 2015 World Championships in Athletics in Beijing. She holds a master's degree in urbanism from Cergy-Pontoise University.

Competition record
She has represented France in the 4 × 400 m relay in London Olympic games where she was a finalist. Her best results include a bronze medal in 2013 World Championships in Athletics in the 4 × 400 m, which was given to her in 2017 after disqualification of the Russian team; and a gold medal in 4 × 400 m in 2015 European Athletics Indoor Championships. She has also participated in World Championships in 2011 and 2015.

References

External links
 profile on FFA

1989 births
Living people
French female sprinters
Athletes (track and field) at the 2012 Summer Olympics
Athletes (track and field) at the 2016 Summer Olympics
Olympic athletes of France
European Athletics Championships medalists
Sportspeople from Reims
World Athletics Championships athletes for France
Olympic female sprinters
21st-century French women